Rosanna DeSoto (born September 2, 1950) is an American actress who has performed in films and television. She is best known for her roles in Stand and Deliver, for which she won an Independent Spirit Award for Best Supporting Female, and in Star Trek VI: The Undiscovered Country as Azetbur, the daughter of Klingon Chancellor Gorkon.

Her other film roles include La Bamba (1987) as Ritchie Valens' mother Connie Valenzuela; and Family Business (1989) as the wife of Vito McMullen (Dustin Hoffman).

DeSoto's first television role was in the series A.E.S. Hudson Street (1978) as Nurse Rosa Santiago. She starred in the short-lived series The Redd Foxx Show (1986). She has made guest appearances on many television series, including Cannon, Kung Fu, Barnaby Jones, Barney Miller, Melrose Place, Murder, She Wrote, The Bold and the Beautiful and Law & Order.

Early life and education
DeSoto was born in San Jose, California on September 2, 1950.  Both of her parents were Mexican immigrants from Michoacán.  DeSoto had four brothers and four sisters, making her one of nine siblings. She spent her early years handpicking fruit, particularly apples.

DeSoto graduated from San Jose State University, double majoring in Spanish literature and drama.  During her tenure at SJSU, DeSoto rehearsed and performed with the Light Opera Company.

Career
DeSoto made her film debut in 1979 with The In-Laws.  She appeared opposite Nick Nolte and Debra Winger in Cannery Row (1982).  DeSoto won the Golden Eagle Award for Best Actress for her performance in The Ballad of Gregorio Cortez (1982).  In 1986, she appeared opposite Rob Lowe and Demi Moore in About Last Night, playing Mrs. Lyons.  That same year, she portrayed waitress Diana Olmos in the short-lived sitcom, The Redd Foxx Show.

In 1987, DeSoto appeared in the biographic film La Bamba.  In that film, she portrayed Connie Valenzuela, the mother of Ritchie Valens, played by Lou Diamond Phillips.  The next year, DeSoto collaborated with Phillips again in the 1988 biopic Stand and Deliver, where she portrayed Fabiola Escalante, the wife of Jaime Escalante (Edward James Olmos).  Her performance garnered her an Independent Spirit Award for Best Supporting Female.

In 1989, she played the wife of Dustin Hoffman's character in Family Business.  That same year, she landed the principal role in Face of the Enemy.  She also played Azetbur in Star Trek VI: The Undiscovered Country (1991).  DeSoto portrayed Linda in The 24 Hour Woman (1999).  She has also acted in the soap opera, The Bold and the Beautiful.

DeSoto wrote and appeared in “A Woman in Progress/Canto de Oro, Cuento de Mujer” that was produced by the Intar Theater group in New York in 2005.

Personal life
From 1974 to 1978, DeSoto was married to Jonathan Taplin.  They have one daughter, Daniela (born June 1976).

DeSoto has been married to David S. Ward since September 20, 1980.  They have a daughter, Sylvana Ward Durrett (born 1981).

DeSoto is also the aunt of Ken Ramoz, who appeared in such films as Gettysburg (1993) and Getting Even with Dad (1994).

Filmography

Film

Television

References

External links
 
 

1950 births
Living people
20th-century American actresses
21st-century American actresses
Actresses from San Jose, California
American actresses of Mexican descent
American film actresses
American television actresses
Independent Spirit Award for Best Supporting Female winners
San Jose State University alumni